Giulia Melucci (born May 28, 1966) is an American writer living in Brooklyn, New York.

Biography
Melucci graduated from Sarah Lawrence College in 1988. Her first book, I Loved, I Lost, I Made Spaghetti, was published by Grand Central Publishing on April 8, 2009. Her memoir was also published in the Netherlands, Germany, Australia, Poland, Brazil, and Turkey.

References

External links
Official website

1966 births
Living people
American memoirists
Harper's Magazine people
Sarah Lawrence College alumni
American women memoirists
Writers from New York City
21st-century American women